"Rock ‘N’ Roll Lies" is the debut single by English indie rock band Razorlight. It is the second track on their 2004 debut album Up All Night. The single was released in August 2003 and peaked at No. 56 on the UK Singles Chart.

Track listing 
7"
"Rock ‘N’ Roll Lies"
"In the City"
CD
"Rock ‘N’ Roll Lies"
"Action!"
"Yeah Yeah Yeah"

Chart performance

References

2003 debut singles
Razorlight songs
Songs written by Johnny Borrell
2003 songs
Vertigo Records singles